Castle Hill is a  Tudor Revival mansion in Ipswich, Massachusetts built 1926-1928 as a summer home for Mr. and Mrs. Richard Teller Crane, Jr.  It is also the name of the  drumlin surrounded by sea and salt marsh the home was built atop.   Both are part of the  Crane Estate located on Argilla Road. The estate includes a historic mansion, 21 outbuildings, and landscapes overlooking Ipswich Bay, on the seacoast off Route 1, north of Boston. Its name derives from a promontory in Ipswich, Suffolk, England, from which many early Massachusetts Bay Colony settlers immigrated.

The estate is a relatively intact work from the Country Place Era of the turn of the 20th century, when wealthy families built extensive country estates. The Crane Estate includes architectural and landscape designs from at least seven firms or individuals of national reputation, including the Olmsted Brothers and Shepley, Rutan and Coolidge, and is extensively documented. In recognition of its state of preservation and design, it was designated a National Historic Landmark in 1998. The property is now owned by The Trustees of Reservations and is open to the public.

History
Its history dates back as far as December 29, 1634, when a group of Ipswich town selectmen unanimously voted "That the Neck of Land wheareuppon the great Hill standeth, which is known by the name of the Castle Hill, lyeinge on the other side of this River towards the Sea, shall remayne unto the common use of the Towne forever."

In June 1637, John Winthrop, Jr., the town's founder and son of Governor John Winthrop, threatened to leave Ipswich, and Castle Hill was deeded to him as an enticement to stay. In 1644, he deeded Castle Hill to Samuel Symonds, Deputy Governor, who in turn deeded it to his son-in-law, Daniel Epps, in 1660. By 1745, it belonged to the Brown family.

After John Burnham Brown died, the property was purchased by Richard Teller Crane, Jr., on January 10, 1910. Crane was the son of wealthy industrialist Richard Teller Crane who had founded the Crane Co. of Chicago in 1855.

It was declared a National Historic Landmark in 1998.

Design

Crane hired the famous Olmsted Brothers, sons of Frederick Law Olmsted (creator of New York's Central Park, Brooklyn's Prospect Park, Boston's Emerald Necklace and others), to design the landscaping. Classical-style statuary flank this "Grande Allée" at regular intervals. An opulent "casino" was built at its midpoint, replete with saltwater swimming pool, bathhouse, guest cabanas and a sizable indoor ballroom. Two main gardens, the "Italian Garden" and the "Rose Garden," once contained ornate plantings, landscaped walkways and Italianesque fountains.

Atop Castle Hill, Crane built an Italian Renaissance-style villa, with stucco walls and red tiled roof. Designed by Shepley, Rutan and Coolidge of Boston, the edifice was set upon the highest promontory overlooking the Atlantic Ocean. His wife Florence, however, felt that the mansion was cold and drafty, and she made her displeasure known. Crane countered by promising that if she would give it ten years, he would replace it if she still insisted.

"Upon the summit Mr. Crane has erected his splendid summer home, with a beautiful sunken garden, rose garden, lawns and terraces, commanding a marvelous view of land and sea, of Agamenticus and Boar's Head and the low-lying Isles of Shoals on the distant horizon, Bar Island and the long bar with its many lines of white breakers, sand dunes and the level beach near at hand. Mr. Crane has purchased as well, Wigwam Hill and the great tract of picturesque dunes, the old Castle Neck, with the exception of the small tract owned by the United States, on which the light house was built in 1837. He has acquired also the Sagamore Hill farm." (Thomas Franklin Waters, Ipswich in the Massachusetts Bay Colony, Vol. 2, 1917.)

In 1924, the Italian Renaissance-style villa was torn down, as promised, and a new mansion subsequently took its place. Designed by architect David Adler of Chicago, the new fifty-nine-room mansion included a main facade in the 17th-century Stuart style, a library with Grinling Gibbons carvings imported from an English country house (Cassiobury House), parquet wood flooring, and paneled interior rooms from an 18th-century townhouse at 75 Dean Street, London. The rear aspect of the house, with its octagonal towers and inset roundels, was modeled on Ham House. Completed in 1928, this splendid mansion still stands, and the Olmsted Brothers' landscaping also remains largely unchanged. A pair of immense seated griffin statues by renowned sculptor Paul Manship grace the entrance to the north terrace overlooking the sea. These were a gift from employees of Crane Co. to Richard Crane in 1928, upon completion of his new home.

Trust
After the death of Richard Crane in 1931 on his 58th birthday, the estate passed to his wife, Florence. In 1945, the Crane family donated much of their private beach and dunes to The Trustees of Reservations, a private, non-profit land conservation and historic preservation organization, with 112 properties throughout the Commonwealth of Massachusetts. When Florence Crane died in 1949, the rest of the property, including the mansion, was given to The Trustees, who maintain the property to this day and offer tours of the historic mansion seasonally.

The property was used as a forum for outdoor concerts in the late 1950s and early 1960s, featuring such jazz legends as Louis Armstrong, Ella Fitzgerald, and Dave Brubeck, and as part of a Castle Hill Art Center and music camp run by the New England Conservatory. Laid out just above the casino and pool, the stage faced the "Great House" so that audiences could sit on the lawn of the Grande Allée, facing the ocean. The Trustees continue to offer a number of public programs throughout the year, including outdoor picnic concerts on the Allée, and Christmas events. All part of the Crane Estate, Castle Hill's once-private beaches are now open to the public as Crane Beach.

Since 1996, The Trustees have hosted outdoor picnic concerts each week in the summer. The groups that play at the concerts tend to be from a wide variety of musical genres.

In popular culture
The 1987 movie The Witches of Eastwick prominently features the grounds and mansion at Castle Hill, the site filmed on location as home of the eccentric millionaire Daryl Van Horne, played by Jack Nicholson.

The 1987 movie Flowers in the Attic also features Castle Hill. It is the main location at which nearly all scenes were filmed. The beginning scene shows the children walking towards the front of the house after being dropped off by the bus. In reality, the bus stop is at the end of the rolling green, where the lawn ends and the ocean begins.

The 1994 movie The Next Karate Kid also features Castle Hill as the Buddhist monastery Mr. Miyagi (Pat Morita) takes Julie Pierce (Hilary Swank) to after she is suspended from school for 2 weeks.

The 2009 movie Ghosts of Girlfriends Past was predominantly filmed inside and outside the mansion. Several fake windows, statues, and columns were added to the building, in addition to a circular driveway added to the front. These fiberglass additions have now been removed, along with the circular driveway.

In the 2014 movie The Equalizer, the Crane Estate serves as a Russian oligarch's Moscow, Russia mansion in one of the final scenes.

Phil Keoghan opened the first episode and introduced the video background segments of the contestants of The Amazing Race 17 from the grass mall.

The Crane Estate was featured in several scenes of the 2019 movie Little Women.

See also
National Register of Historic Places listings in Ipswich, Massachusetts
National Register of Historic Places listings in Essex County, Massachusetts
List of National Historic Landmarks in Massachusetts

References

External links

The Trustees of Reservations: Castle Hill on the Crane Estate
The Trustees of Reservations: Crane Beach on the Crane Estate
The Trustees of Reservations: Crane Wildlife Refuge on the Crane Estate
Aerial photograph by Philip Greenspun

Historic house museums in Massachusetts
The Trustees of Reservations
Houses completed in 1926
Bay Circuit Trail
Museums in Essex County, Massachusetts
Houses in Ipswich, Massachusetts
Ipswich, Massachusetts
Parks in Essex County, Massachusetts
National Historic Landmarks in Massachusetts
National Register of Historic Places in Ipswich, Massachusetts
David Adler buildings
Houses on the National Register of Historic Places in Essex County, Massachusetts
Protected areas established in 1949
1949 establishments in Massachusetts
Gilded Age mansions
Tudor Revival architecture in Massachusetts